The 2011 Vuelta a Burgos (2011 Tour of Burgos) was the 33rd edition of the Vuelta a Burgos, an annual bicycle race which tours the province of Burgos. Beginning in Villarcayo on 3 August, it concluded at the Lagunas de Neila on 7 August. The 646.6 km long stage race was part of the 2010–11 UCI Europe Tour, and was classified as a 2.HC event. Joaquim Rodríguez won the general classification, while his teammate Daniel Moreno secured a 1–2 victory for Team Katusha. Reigning champion Samuel Sánchez participated but finished fourth. Rodríguez also claimed the points classification title.

Teams

15 teams were invited to participate in the tour: 3 UCI ProTeams, 10 UCI Professional Continental Teams and 2 UCI Continental Teams.

Stages

Stage 1
3 August 2011 – Villarcayo to Miranda de Ebro,

Stage 2
4 August 2011 – Burgos to Burgos,

Stage 3
5 August 2011 – Pradoluengo to Belorado,  team time trial (TTT)

Stage 4
6 August 2011 – Roa de Duero to Ciudad Romana de Clunia,

Stage 5
7 August 2011 – Areniscas de los Pinares to Lagunas de Neila,

Classification leadership

Final standings

General classification

Points classification

Mountains classification

Sprints classification

Team classification

References
General

Specific

External links
Vuelta a Burgos homepage

Burgos
Vuelta a Burgos
Vuelta a Burgos
2011 in road cycling